Diamond Dick is a fictional character created by William B. Schwartz.  He first appeared in "Dashing Diamond Dick; or, The Sarpint of Siskiyou County", serialized novel in Street and Smith's story paper New York Weekly in 1878, and began as a regular series in Nugget Library, with No. 16, December 12, 1889.  According to J. Randolph Cox, "the character was undoubtedly inspired by the life and career of herbal-medicine promoter and showman George B. McClellan (ca. 1858–1911), who went by the nickname Diamond Dick and who was the hero of a dime novel by Buckskin Sam Hall" (1882).
 
The character's real name was Richard Wade.  His son, Bertie Wade, was known as Diamond Dick, Jr.  The series was known for occurring in real time.  The characters aged and the world changed (i.e. new technologies such as cars were introduced). Dick was famous for wearing diamond-studded clothes.  He was described as handsome, and had dark hair and moustache.

The original serials were signed Delta Claveras, and the later weekly stories by the house name W. B. Lawson.  Research suggests Theodore Dreiser may have written some stories and served as editor.  George C. Jenks also wrote under this name, as did St George Henry Rathbone.

Appearances
 New York Weekly 1878, 1880
 Diamond Dick Library Nos. 158–205, 1895–1896
 Diamond Dick Weekly Nos. 1–373, 1896–1903
 Diamond Dick, Jr. Weekly Nos. 374–762, 1903–1911
 Diamond Dick Quarterly Nos. 1–5, 1897–1899
 Nugget Library regular series beginning with No. 16, 1889
 Aldine Tip Top Tales (British reprints, beginning late 1890s)
 Great Western Library 1927

References

Literary characters introduced in 1878
Characters in pulp fiction
Fictional American people